Ivan Ćurić may refer to:
Ivan Ćurić (bishop) (born 1964), Croatian Roman Catholic prelate
Ivan Ćurić (footballer) (born 1987), Croatian footballer